Rotch Dome is the sloping ice dome rising to 360 m immediately east of Byers Peninsula, and between Barclay Bay and Walker Bay in Livingston Island, South Shetland Islands, Antarctica. It is bounded by Urvich Wall to the west, surmounting Ivanov Beach to the northwest, Etar Snowfield to the north-northeast and Verila Glacier to the east-northeast, and is linked by a saddle to Casanovas Peak to the northeast.

The slopes of Rotch Dome west of 60º53'45"W were included in 2016 into the Antarctic Specially Protected Area Byers Peninsula (ASPA 126), with a designated zone comprising the northwestern part of Rotch Dome and the adjacent deglaciated ground on Ivanov Beach placed under greater restriction on access in order to prevent microbial or other contamination by human activity.

Location

Maps
 L.L. Ivanov et al. Antarctica: Livingston Island and Greenwich Island, South Shetland Islands. Scale 1:100000 topographic map. Sofia: Antarctic Place-names Commission of Bulgaria, 2005.
 L.L. Ivanov. Antarctica: Livingston Island and Greenwich, Robert, Snow and Smith Islands. Scale 1:120000 topographic map.  Troyan: Manfred Wörner Foundation, 2009.  
 Antarctic Digital Database (ADD). Scale 1:250000 topographic map of Antarctica. Scientific Committee on Antarctic Research (SCAR). Since 1993, regularly upgraded and updated.
 L.L. Ivanov. Antarctica: Livingston Island and Smith Island. Scale 1:100000 topographic map. Manfred Wörner Foundation, 2017.

In fiction

Rotch Dome is part of the mise-en-scène in the 2016 Antarctica thriller novel The Killing Ship by Simon Beaufort, with action spreading westwards from Hannah Point, skirting the dome and eventually reaching Byers Peninsula; the feature is shown on a sketch map of Livingston Island illustrating the book.

Notes

References
 Rotch Dome. SCAR Composite Antarctic Gazetteer

Landforms of Livingston Island
Ice caps of Antarctica